Solo is the surname of:

People
 Bobby Solo (born 1945), Italian singer, musician and film actor
 Ed Solo, British disc jockey and record producer
 Hope Solo (born 1981), American soccer goalkeeper
 Krsna Solo, Indian composer, singer-songwriter and music producer
 Ksenia Solo (born 1987), Latvian-Canadian actress
 Mano Solo (1963–2010), French singer
 Manolo Solo or Manuel Fernandez, Spanish actor
 Methaneilie Solo (born 1955), Naga singer and composer
 Neba Solo or Souleymane Traoré (born 1969), Malian musician
 Pam Solo (born 1946), arms control analyst
 Sal Solo (born 1961), English singer
 Simon Solo (born 1961), Papua New Guinea politician

Characters
 Han Solo, from the Star Wars films
 Ben Solo, from the Star Wars films 
 Solo family, relatives of Han in the Star Wars Expanded Universe
 Napoleon Solo, in the American TV series The Man from U.N.C.L.E.